Tumatar (also Romanized as Tūmatar) is a village in Baranduzchay-ye Jonubi Rural District, in the Central District of Urmia County, West Azerbaijan Province, Iran. At the 2006 census, its population was 685, in 189 families.

References 

Populated places in Urmia County